Sharon Miller is a Jamaican bureaucrat and diplomat currently serving as Jamaica Ambassador Extraordinary and Plenipotentiary of Jamaica to the Republics of Argentina, Paraguay, Federative Republic of Brazil, Chile, and the Oriental Republic of Uruguay.

Education 
Miller was educated at the University of the West Indies, where she obtained a bachelor's degree in public administration before receiving training in diplomacy, trade policy and law, policy analysis & strategic planning, and environmental management for the public sector.

Career 
Miller started her diplomatic career in the Ministry of Foreign Affairs and Foreign Trade, where she served in various administrative positions. She served as under-secretary, Multilateral Affairs Division in acting capacity and was director, economic affairs, interim director, international organisations and bilateral relations in the foreign affairs and trade ministry before being posted to the Jamaica embassy in Washington, D.C., as chargé d'affaires, and deputy chief of mission and served as deputy high commissioner for the Jamaican High Commission in Ottawa, Canada. She was the director of the economic affairs at the Foreign Ministry and a member of the permanent mission to the International Seabed Authority, headquartered in Kingston when she was appointed ambassador.

References 

Jamaican diplomats
University of the West Indies alumni